In complex geometry, a polar homology is a group which captures holomorphic invariants  of a complex manifold in a similar way to usual homology of a manifold in differential topology. Polar homology was defined by B. Khesin and A. Rosly in 1999.

Definition
Let M be a complex projective manifold.

Defining 

Defining 
The space  is generated by the following relations.

 if .
 provided that 
 

where 

Defining the boundary operator 

The boundary operator  is defined by

,

Khesin and Rosly proved that this boundary operator is well defined, and satisfies . They defined the polar cohomology as the quotient .

Notes 

 B. Khesin, A. Rosly, Polar Homology and Holomorphic Bundles Phil. Trans. Roy. Soc. Lond. A359 (2001) 1413-1428

Complex manifolds
Several complex variables
Homology theory